Wann is a town in Nowata County, Oklahoma, United States. The population was 125 at the 2010 census, a decrease of 5.3 percent from the figure of 132 recorded in 2000.  Wann is known for the "Six Flag Poles Over Wann America.

History
The town of Wann has connections to both Cherokee and Eastern Delaware origins. The town and a nearby creek were originally named Coon, after a Delaware family, when the first post office opened July 26, 1895. The town was renamed Wann on October 13, 1899, to honor a local Cherokee, Robert F. Wann. The town was a station on the stage route between Coffeyville, Kansas and Bartlesville, Indian Territory. When the Katy Railroad built its track northwest of town in 1902, the townspeople relocated to be nearer the Wann railroad station.

Wann had 201 inhabitants at Oklahoma's  first census in 1907. Oil was discovered in the Wann Oil Pool about this time, leading the population to grow to 286 in 1910 and 404 in 1920. The boom collapsed and so did the population.

The railroad track was abandoned in the 1980s, following the demise of the Katy Railroad. Wann's economy now depends on local farming and ranching.

Geography
Wann is located at  (36.915015, -95.805012).

Demographics

As of the census of 2000, there were 132 people, 50 households, and 35 families residing in the town. There were 59 housing units at an average density of 339.1 per square mile (134.0/km2). The racial makeup of the town was 68.18% White, 21.21% Native American, and 10.61% from two or more races. Hispanic or Latino of any race were 7.58% of the population.

There were 50 households, out of which 36.0% had children under the age of 18 living with them, 60.0% were married couples living together, 8.0% had a female householder with no husband present, and 30.0% were non-families. 30.0% of all households were made up of individuals, and 10.0% had someone living alone who was 65 years of age or older. The average household size was 2.64 and the average family size was 3.09.

In the town, the population was spread out, with 34.1% under the age of 18, 5.3% from 18 to 24, 25.0% from 25 to 44, 24.2% from 45 to 64, and 11.4% who were 65 years of age or older. The median age was 35 years. For every 100 females, there were 94.1 males. For every 100 females age 18 and over, there were 107.1 males.

The median income for a household in the town was $27,917, and the median income for a family was $33,750. Males had a median income of $26,250 versus $21,250 for females. The per capita income for the town was $13,512. There were 9.7% of families and 9.3% of the population living below the poverty line, including no under eighteens and 15.0% of those over 64.

References

External links
 Six Flagpoles over Wann, America

Towns in Nowata County, Oklahoma
Towns in Oklahoma